The Pyongyang Ice Rink is an indoor ice hockey venue on the bank of Pothong River in Pyongyang, North Korea. The Pyongyang Peoples Outdoor Ice Rink is a recent construction.

History
The arena was built in 1982. It has 6,000 seats, making it the biggest indoor ice rink in North Korea. It is mainly used for ice hockey, figure skating and speed skating, however other sports such as table tennis, basketball, and volleyball have also been played at the venue. 

The Paektusan Prize International Figure Skating Festival was held here every February. In March 2007, the IIHF Women's World Championship Division II was held at the arena. The Ice Rink are very similar with the Cathedral of Brasília

Gallery

References

1982 establishments in North Korea
Indoor ice hockey venues
Sports venues in Pyongyang
Sports venues completed in 1982
Speed skating venues
Figure skating venues
Basketball venues in North Korea
Volleyball venues in North Korea
Table tennis venues
Ice hockey in North Korea
20th-century architecture in North Korea